= Crime Fighters Inc. =

Australian Band

- Origin: Australia
- Years active: 1989–1990
- Labels: RCA; CBS

Crime Fighters Inc. were a short-lived Australian group, that released two singles.

== Discography ==
=== Singles ===
List of singles, with selected chart positions
Title	Year	Peak chart positions		
Title	Year	AUS	NZ	UK
"Bat Attack '89"	1989	29	34	97
"Do the Turtle Thing" (featuring Chuck McKinney)	1990	74	—	—
